The 1918 Pennsylvania gubernatorial election occurred on November 5, 1918. Incumbent Republican  governor Martin Brumbaugh was not a candidate for re-election. Republican candidate William Sproul defeated Democratic candidate Eugene C. Bonniwell to become Governor of Pennsylvania.

Results

References

1918
Pennsylvania
Gubernatorial
November 1918 events